Chen Wenxuan may refer to:

Tan Boen Soan (1905–1952), ethnic Chinese Malay-language writer and journalist of Indonesia
Yu Wo (born 1984), Taiwanese novelist